Heidelberg is a city in Le Sueur County, Minnesota, United States. The population was 122 at the 2010 census.

Geography

County Highway 28 serves as a main route in the community.  Minnesota State Highway 13 passes nearby.

History
Heidelberg was platted in 1878, and named by its original German settlers (Frank Heil and Frederick Ihrig) after Heidelberg, in Germany. A post office operated in the community from 1872 until 1903. Heidelberg was incorporated in 1894.

Demographics

The median income for a household in the city as of 2009 was $69,686. The per capita income for the city was $25,398. None of the population or the families were below the poverty line.

2010 census
As of the census of 2010, there were 122 people, 41 households, and 34 families residing in the city. The racial makeup of the city was 100.0% White. Hispanic or Latino of any race were 1.6% of the population.

There were 41 households, of which 51.2% had children under the age of 18 living with them, 75.6% were married couples living together, 4.9% had a female householder with no husband present, 2.4% had a male householder with no wife present, and 17.1% were non-families. 12.2% of all households were made up of individuals, and 4.9% had someone living alone who was 65 years of age or older. The average household size was 2.98 and the average family size was 3.32.

The median age in the city was 40.3 years. 33.6% of residents were under the age of 18; 2.4% were between the ages of 18 and 24; 27.9% were from 25 to 44; 25.4% were from 45 to 64; and 10.7% were 65 years of age or older. The gender makeup of the city was 55.7% male and 44.3% female.

References

External links
Official website

Cities in Minnesota
Cities in Le Sueur County, Minnesota
1878 establishments in Minnesota